Karl Henriksson (born 5 February 2001) is a Swedish ice hockey centre for the Hartford Wolf Pack of the American Hockey League (AHL) as a prospect of the New York Rangers of the National Hockey League (NHL). He was selected in the second round, 58th overall pick, of the 2019 NHL Entry Draft by the New York Rangers.

Playing career
In the 2018–19 season Henriksson led Frölunda HC J20 in scoring with 49 points on 13 goals and 36 assists. He also played in two games for Frölunda HC of the Swedish Hockey League in 2018–19 without picking up a point. In the 2019 NHL Entry Draft, Henriksson was selected with the 58th overall pick by the New York Rangers. On 26 March 2020, he signed a two-year contract extension with Frölunda HC. During the 2020–21 season, he recorded one goal and seven assists in 44 games with Frölunda HC during the regular season, and appeared in four playoff games with the team. On 21 April 2021, Henriksson signed a three-year, entry-level contract with the New York Rangers.

According to Frölunda director of player development Mikael Ström, Henriksson "always makes other guys better. Everyone wants to play with Karl because they know, of course, he’s a really good stick-handler and he can score. But he also works hard every shift and he has a smartness on the ice. He sees other guys — and I think he sees other guys one step before anyone else can see them."

Career statistics

Regular season and playoffs

International

References

External links
 

2001 births
Living people
Frölunda HC players
Hartford Wolf Pack players
New York Rangers draft picks
Södertälje SK players
Sportspeople from Malmö
Swedish ice hockey centres